The men's 4 × 100 metres relay competition at the 2012 Summer Olympics in London, United Kingdom, was held at the Olympic Stadium on 10–11 August.

Overview
On 11 August, the Jamaican national team, led by Nesta Carter, Michael Frater, Yohan Blake and Usain Bolt, won the gold medal and broke their own world record of 37.04 set at the 2011 World Championships in Athletics, with a time of 36.84.

Carter did not start well, and Trell Kimmons of the United States led the first 100 metres. Kimmons handed the baton to former world champion and Olympic champion Justin Gatlin, who was in the lead. By the third changeover, America had a slight lead over the Jamaicans, but when Michael Frater handed over to Yohan Blake, Blake took the final bend and made up ground and overtook Tyson Gay of the US. Blake then passed the baton to Bolt slightly ahead of Gay's pass to Ryan Bailey. In the final 100 metres, Bolt extended that lead to a few metres and crossed the line in a new world-record time for his country for the second consecutive Olympics, with the US finishing second. Although the Canadian team finished third, they were disqualified after third leg runner Jared Connaughton stepped on a line, and the bronze medal went to Trinidad and Tobago.

While the Jamaican team were breaking the world record, the American team crossed the line in exactly the same time as the previous record of 37.04 seconds, setting a new national record.

In May 2014, the United States Anti-Doping Agency imposed a one-year suspension on a 4 × 100 m relay team member Tyson Gay. In May 2015, the International Olympic Committee formally requested the United States Olympic Committee to collect the medals from teammates Trell Kimmons, Justin Gatlin, Ryan Bailey, Jeffery Demps and Darvis Patton. The medals were reallocated, with Trinidad and Tobago awarded silver, and France the bronze.

Records
Prior to the competition, the existing World and Olympic records were as follows.

The following records were established during the competition:

Schedule
All times are British Summer Time (UTC+1)

Result

Round 1
Qual. rule: first 3 of each heat (Q) plus the 2 fastest times (q) qualified.

Heat 1

Heat 2

Final
Results of the Final:

References

Athletics at the 2012 Summer Olympics
Relay foot races at the Olympics
Olympics 2012
Men's events at the 2012 Summer Olympics